Michael Greis (born 18 August 1976) is a former German biathlete.

Career
Greis first competed at the 2002 Winter Olympics in Salt Lake City, finishing 15th and 16th in the 10 km sprint and 12.5 km pursuit events in the biathlon.

Greis won the World Cup in the individual category in 2004/05, and was a member of the winning 4 × 7.5 km relay team in the 2004 Biathlon World Championships, and took silver in the individual 20 km category at the 2005 World Championships.

At the 2006 Winter Olympics, Greis came into the games heading the World Cup standings and took the first Olympic gold of the games with victory in the individual 20 km ahead of the defending Olympic champion Ole Einar Bjørndalen.  He was also a member of the German team that won the 4 × 7.5 km relay.

On 25 February 2006 Greis won the men's 15 km event and became the first person to capture three gold medals at the Turin Olympic Games. (Koreans Jin Sun-Yu and Ahn Hyun Soo became the second and third later on the same day with victories in short track speed skating.)

Greis was named German sportsman of the year, along with fellow biathlete Kati Wilhelm, by journalists.

In the 2006/07 World Cup season, Greis won the Overall and the Sprint competition.

In the 2007/08 World Cup season Greis managed onto the podium on a regular basis, attaining three victories, three 2nd places as well as three 3rds.  At the season's World Champs in Östersund Greis did not participate in the sprint and in the pursuit but being anchor both in the men's Relay and the mixed Relay, helped to secure a gold and a bronze for his team.

Prior to the 2008/09 World Cup season Greis had had a serious disagreement with the Germans' head coach Frank Ullrich the reason being Ullrich's authoritative management of the team, which resulted in Greis' departure from Ullrich's jurisdiction to train on his own. This yielded him quite a solid performance throughout the year, with another two World Cup victories and the relay bronze at the Biathlon World Championships 2009 in South Korea.

Greis participated in the 2010 Olympic Games in Vancouver, Canada which turned to be a disappointing performance for his fans as he finished in the mediocre 10th place twice, in the Individual and the Mass Start, along with coming 5th in the relay and the pursuit, adding to a streak of unsuccessful Olympic performances by the German biathlon male team when not a single German won any medal in biathlon for the first time in the Olympic history.

After the first round of the 2012–13 World Cup, Greis announced his retirement on 5 December 2012 citing a lack of motivation, making the 20 km in Östersund on 28 November his last competition as he had dropped the sprint and pursuit. After retiring, Greis studied International Management at Ansbach University of Applied Sciences. He also worked as a pundit for Eurosport. Subsequently in 2016 he was appointed as head coach at the national biathlon training centre for east Switzerland at Lenzerheide, where he coached youth biathletes. After two years in this post, in April 2018 he was announced as head coach of the United States men's biathlon team. After one season in this role, in May 2019 he was named as head coach for the Polish women's biathlon team.

Biathlon results
All results are sourced from the International Biathlon Union.

Olympic Games
3 medals (3 gold)

*Mass start was added as an event in 2006.

World Championships
12 medals (3 gold, 3 silver, 6 bronze)

*During Olympic seasons competitions are only held for those events not included in the Olympic program.
**The mixed relay was added as an event in 2005.

Individual victories
11 victories (3 In, 4 Sp, 2 Pu, 2 MS)

*Results are from UIPMB and IBU races which include the Biathlon World Cup, Biathlon World Championships and the Winter Olympic Games.

See also
List of multiple Olympic gold medalists in one event

References

External links
 Official website
 

1976 births
Biathletes at the 2002 Winter Olympics
Biathletes at the 2006 Winter Olympics
Biathletes at the 2010 Winter Olympics
Living people
Sportspeople from Füssen
German male biathletes
Olympic biathletes of Germany
Medalists at the 2006 Winter Olympics
Olympic medalists in biathlon
Olympic gold medalists for Germany
Biathlon World Championships medalists
Holmenkollen medalists
German cross-country skiing coaches
21st-century German people